This is a list of mayors of Barcelona since 1916.

Mayors before Franco 
...
Bartomeu Robert i Yarzábal (1899 - 1901)
...
Manuel Rius i Rius (1916 - 1917)
Antoni Martínez i Domingo (1917 - 1917)
Lluís Duran i Ventosa (1917 - 1917)
Juan José Rocha i García (1917 - 1918)
Manuel Morales i Pareja (1918 - 1919)
Antoni Martínez i Domingo (1919 - 1922)
Ferran Fabra i Puig (1922 - 1923)
Josep Banqué i Feliu (1923 - 1923)
Fernando Álvarez de la Campa (1923 - 1924)
Darius Romeu i Freixa (1924 - 1930)
Joan Antoni Güell i López (1930 - 1931)
Jaume Aiguader (1931 - 1934)
Carles Pi i Sunyer (1934 - 1934)
Josep Martínez i Herrero (1934 - 1935)
Joan Pich i Pon (1935 - 1935)
Francesc Jaumar i de Bofarull (1935 - 1935)
Ramon Coll i Rodés  (1935 - 1936)
Carles Pi i Sunyer  (1936 - 1937)
Hilari Salvadó i Castell  (1937 - 1939)
Víctor Felipe Martínez (January 26 of 1939)

Mayors during the Franco era
Miquel Mateu i Pla (1939-1945)
Josep M. Albert i Despujol (1945-1951)
Antoni M. Simarro i Puig (1951-1957)
Josep Maria de Porcioles i Colomer (1957-1973)
Enric Massó i Vázquez (1973-1975)

Mayors during and since the Spanish transition to democracy

Timeline from 1979

See also
 Timeline of Barcelona

External links

List
Mayors Barcelona
Barcelona
Mayors